Charles Wesley "Shifty" Bolen (January 8, 1894 – December 28, 1953) was an American football and basketball player, coach, and college athletics administrator.

While attending Ohio State University, Bolen played three years for both the Ohio State Buckeyes football and Buckeyes basketball teams.  In football, he developed a reputation as a "fierce, tigerish" player and "the premier defensive end in the West", and he was selected as a consensus first-team end on the 1917 College Football All-America Team.  In basketball, he was captain of Ohio State's 1917–18 team.

Bolen served as the head football at Ohio Northern University from 1919 to 1921 and at Wilmington College in Wilmington, Ohio from 1923 to 1929, compiling a career college football coaching record of 37–40–1.  He was also the head coach of the men's basketball team at Ohio Northern from 1919 to 1922, tallying a mark of 37–19.  He served for many years as an administrator in the Ohio Northern athletic department and was the founder of the university's intramural sports program.

Bolen died in 1953 and was buried at the Green Lawn Cemetery in Columbus, Ohio.

Head coaching record

Football

References

External links
 

1894 births
1953 deaths
American football ends
Basketball coaches from Indiana
Ohio Northern Polar Bears baseball coaches
Ohio Northern Polar Bears football coaches
Ohio Northern Polar Bears men's basketball coaches
Ohio State Buckeyes football players
Wilmington Quakers football coaches
Wilmington Quakers men's basketball coaches
All-American college football players
People from Marion, Indiana